Khairat Al-Saleh, born in Jerusalem and educated in Syria and Egypt, is a noted painter in the Hurufiyya movement and a ceramicist, glassmaker and printmaker.

Life and career
Khairat Al-Saleh was born in Jerusalem in 1940. She was educated at the University of Wales Swansea, where she studied English literature and poetry and works as a ceramist, glassmaker, printmaker and painter living between England and Syria. She is noted for her use of calligraphy and miniatures. Inspired by Arab and Islamic art, she experimented with the art of illuminated manuscripts, arabesque and geometric design in her  paintings, prints and ceramics.

As a poet, her work is closely linked to illumination, illustration and the art of the book. Nevertheless, in her art she also explored the liberating effects of water color techniques, even digital art. She trained as a printmaker and ceramist in Richmond, but she is mainly self-taught as an artist. She has exhibited in London, several times at Leighton House Museum, and in many European and Arab countries.  Presently she is producing works of art and writing under a pen name in Britain. She has also published a book which was translated to many languages, entitled Fabled Cities, Princes and Jinn from Arab Myths and Legends.

As a visual artist, Al Saleh works in ceramics, glass, prints and paintings (watercolours and gouache). All her work reflects her Arabic identity. The art historian, Wijdan Ali, classifies her paintings as belonging to the Neoclassical style within the Hurufiyya movement which means that she follows the rules of calligraphy established by 13th-century Sufi calligraphers.

Work

Al-Saleh's work is held in major public art collections, including:
 The National Art Gallery, Amman, Jordan
 GATT Gallery, U.N., Geneva
 World Museum, Rotterdam
 Darat al Funun, Amman, Jordan
 Westminster Bank, London

Exhibitions
 2001-2002: Contemporary Arab Art’', curated by Egee Art Consultancy, Londo, held at the Wereldmuseum, Rotterdam,  6 June 2001 until the 24 March 2002
 2004: Symbols of Harmony: Art from the Islamic World, curated by the Ayagallery and held at the Kent County Gallery, 3 January -29 March 2004

See also
 Calligraphy
 Islamic art
 Islamic calligraphy
 Palestinian art

References

External links
 Anne Mullin Burnham, 1994, Reflections in Women's Eyes, Saudi Aramco World''
 Official website
 http://wwol.inre.asu.edu/al-saleh.html
 https://www.amazon.com/Fabled-Cities-Princes-Legends-Mythology/dp/0872269248
 https://books.google.com/books/about/Fabled_Cities_Princes_and_Jinn_from_Arab.html?id=Iz5LAAAAYAAJ&redir_esc=y

Living people
Syrian women painters
Syrian women poets
Syrian women ceramists
People from Jerusalem
Syrian ceramists
Syrian painters
Syrian poets
Syrian emigrants to the United Kingdom
British women painters
British women ceramicists
Syrian contemporary artists
1940 births
21st-century ceramists